Emanuele Pirro (born 12 January 1962) is an Italian racing driver who has raced in Formula One, touring cars and in endurance races such as the 24 Hours of Le Mans which he has won a total of five times. Two times Italian Karting Champion (1976, 1979), Formula Fiat Abarth Champion (1980), two times Italian Touring Car Champion (1994, 1995), two times Italian Overall Champion (1995, 1996) and German Touring Car Champion (1996), he also achieved records in endurance racing that place him amongst the best in the discipline, including; five wins in the 24 Hours of Le Mans (2000, 2001, 2002, 2006, 2007), two times ALMS Champion (2001, 2005), two times winner of the 12 Hours of Sebring (2000, 2007), three times winner of Petit Le Mans (2001, 2005, 2008), winner of the 24 Hours Nürburgring (1989), two times winner of the Macau Guia Race (1991, 1992) and two times winner of the Goodwood RAC Historic TT. He has taken part in over 500 official national and international races.

Personal life 
He was born in Rome, however he traces his roots to the small town of Latera near Viterbo through his mother's family. He is married to Marlene, with whom he has two sons, Cristoforo, born in 1993 (Mechanical Engineer, currently Performance Engineer in F1) and Goffredo, born in 1996 (Automotive Engineer specialised in Motorsport).

Career 
He began racing cars in 1980 after having raced seven years in go-karts, where he was two time Italian Champion and runner up in both the European and the World Karting Championships. He went on to win races in all the feeder series he competed in including F3, F3000 and Formula Nippon.

Formula One

In 1988 he was contracted by McLaren to become test driver to develop the new Honda powertrain for the MP4/4, staying on in that role for the following 3 seasons.

His racing career in F1 started at the 1989 French Grand Prix for the Benetton-Ford team, replacing Johnny Herbert who was still recovering from injuries sustained in a F3000 accident. For the 1990 and 1991 seasons, he raced for BMS Scuderia Italia.

Touring cars
Together with his single seater commitments he raced as a factory driver for BMW in touring car racing up until 1993. He raced and won in ETCC, WTCC, Italian Supertouring and DTM. In DTM he became one of the only drivers to win in his debut in the series. Notably, he won the 24 Hours Nürburgring, the Macau Guia Race twice, and the Wellington 500 four times, with the legendary BMW M3 E30 and team Schnitzer. After leaving BMW in 1993 he joined Audi to win the 1994 and 1995 Italian Touring Car Championships followed by the German Touring Car Championship in 1996. Between the years of 1994 and 1996 racing in the Italian and German Supertouring championships, he contested a total of 70 races finishing only once outside of the top 10 after being taken out at the start in 1994 at the Salzburgring.

Sportscars

After his debut in endurance races at the young age of 19 winning in his class with the Lancia Beta Montecarlo Gr.5 at the 24 Hours of Daytona, winning the Kyalami 9 Hours and a terrible experience at Le Mans the same year, he scarcely participated in these races except sporadic appearances in Japan, first with a Nissan Gr.C at the Fuji 1000 km and with a Porsche 962 Gr.C at the Suzuka 1000 km. That is until his return to Le Mans in 1998 with a McLaren F1 alongside Dindo Capello and Thomas Bscher ending with a retirement. In 1999 Audi unveiled the R8R with which he scored his first of a record breaking nine consecutive podiums at the French classic. In 2000 along with Tom Kristensen and Frank Biela he scored the first of three consecutive wins with the new Audi R8. In 2006 together with Frank Biela and Marco Werner he became the first driver to win the 24 Hours of Le Mans with a diesel car, repeating the win in the following year. In 2008 he announced the end of his racing career with Audi sportscars. Between the years of 1999 and 2008 he won five 24 Hours of Le Mans, two ALMS championships, two 12 Hours of Sebring and three Petit Le Mans. After 2008 he competed in a number of additional races including a 12 Hours of Sebring and 24 Hours of Le Mans with Drayson Racing in a Lola-Judd LMP1 car, the 24 hours of the Nuerburgring with an Audi R8 GT3, the 2011 Gold Coast 500 in the Australian V8 Supercars Championship.

After racing
He regularly competes in historic racing. In 2010 Pirro won the Monaco Historic Grand Prix in the Formula 3 Class.

In roles still linked to motorsport, he serves as a Brand Ambassador for Audi, and is a member of; FIA Drivers’ Commission, FIA Circuits’ Commission, FIA Historic Motorsport Commission, ACI Circuits and Safety Commission. In addition, he is the President of the Italian Karting Commission, and Vice President of the Grand Prix Drivers’ Club and the Club des Pilotes des 24 Heures du Mans. He is also a Steward for F1 races, TV pundit and is a frequent guest speaker at events hosted by multinational companies.

He owns the Faloria Mountain Spa Resort, a 5-star hotel in Cortina d’Ampezzo.

Finally he has been a regular player for over 25 years in the Nazionale Piloti football team and the “Star Team for the Children” for Prince Albert of Monaco as well as taking part in other charity events.

Race results

Complete 24 Hours of Le Mans results

Complete European Formula Two Championship results
(key) (Races in bold indicate pole position; races in italics indicate fastest lap.)

Complete International Formula 3000 results
(key) (Races in bold indicate pole position; races in italics indicate fastest lap.)

Complete Japanese Formula 3000 Championship results
(key) (Races in bold indicate pole position) (Races in italics indicate fastest lap)

Complete Formula One results
(key)

Complete Deutsche Tourenwagen Meisterschaft/Masters results
(key) (Races in bold indicate pole position) (Races in italics indicate fastest lap)

1 –  A non-championship one-off race was held in 2004 at the streets of Shanghai, China.

Complete Italian Touring Car Championship results
(key) (Races in bold indicate pole position) (Races in italics indicate fastest lap)

Complete Super Tourenwagen Cup results
(key) (Races in bold indicate pole position) (Races in italics indicate fastest lap)

Complete American Le Mans Series results
(key) (Races in bold indicate pole position; races in italics indicate fastest lap.)

Macau Grand Prix Guia Race results

 Spa 24 hours : 1st: 1986, 1990
 4 hours of Jarama: 1st: 1987
 Grand Prix of Nürburgring 1st,1986

References
"Five-time LeMans winner Emanuele Pirro joins APR Motorsport for Rolex 24 at Daytona". APR Motorsport. 4 January 2012. Retrieved 13 January 201

Sources
Profile at www.grandprix.com

External links

 
 

1962 births
Living people
Racing drivers from Rome
Italian racing drivers
Italian Formula One drivers
Italian expatriates in Monaco
European Formula Two Championship drivers
Japanese Formula 3000 Championship drivers
Deutsche Tourenwagen Masters drivers
Benetton Formula One drivers
Scuderia Italia Formula One drivers
24 Hours of Le Mans drivers
24 Hours of Le Mans winning drivers
American Le Mans Series drivers
International Formula 3000 drivers
World Touring Car Championship drivers
Supercars Championship drivers
24 Hours of Daytona drivers
Rolex Sports Car Series drivers
World Sportscar Championship drivers
Porsche Supercup drivers
24 Hours of Spa drivers
European Touring Car Championship drivers
12 Hours of Sebring drivers
24H Series drivers
Audi Sport drivers
Team Joest drivers
Team LeMans drivers
Schnitzer Motorsport drivers
Abt Sportsline drivers
Stone Brothers Racing drivers
Phoenix Racing drivers
Nürburgring 24 Hours drivers